Khorram Dasht (also known as Karīm Dasht and Khurram Dasht) is a village in Khorram Dasht Rural District, in the Central District of Kashan County, Isfahan Province, Iran. At the 2006 census, its population was 41, in 21 families.

References 

Populated places in Kashan County